Tore Hedin (7 January 1927 – 22 August 1952) was a Swedish mass murderer and police officer. The act perpetrated by Hedin, commonly known as Hurvamorden, is infamous for being the worst known act of spree killing in Swedish criminal history, and for the fact that Hedin, as a police officer, had been assigned to investigate his own first murder for an extended period. Hedin also employed a medium, itself unique for a Swedish homicide investigation.

First crimes 
Tore Hedin was born in Stora Harrie, Scania, near Kävlinge. He committed his first crime in September 1943, when he broke into a local brewery near his parental home to steal some oats. To avoid detection, he burned down the brewery to hide his crime; this was a method he used later to cover his tracks when he committed far more serious crimes.

On 28 November 1951, Hedin robbed and murdered his friend John Allan Nilsson after a poker game at Nilsson's home in Tjörnarp. To cover his tracks, he burned down the residence. Being the local police representative, he took part in the investigation and even answered questions from the national media concerning the case.

Killing spree 
In the summer of 1952, Hedin's girlfriend, Ulla Östberg, broke off their engagement. Infuriated, Hedin assaulted her with handcuffs and threatened to shoot her. He was subsequently dismissed from the police force for this incident. On the night of August 21, 1952, Hedin went on a killing spree after Östberg refused to take him back despite numerous attempts to win her over. His first stop was his parents' house in Saxtorp, where he killed them both and set the house on fire sometime before midnight.

Thirty minutes later, Hedin arrived at the retirement home in Hurva, where Östberg lived and worked. He climbed a fire escape and entered the room where Östberg usually slept. This night, however, she was not sleeping there, but in the room of the matron, Agnes Lundin. Realising this, Hedin entered Lundin's room and killed them both with an axe. Afterwards, he blocked the entrance to the retirement home and set it on fire. Four elderly people died in the flames, with a fifth dying some days later from severe burns.

It is unclear at what point Hedin decided to take his own life. After starting a manhunt, police found his car parked near a cabin by Lake Brösarp, Skåne County. In the front seat was a suicide note, his jacket and his wallet. The suicide note contained a full confession of all crimes he committed, with an explanation as to why he had killed his parents — so that they would not have to suffer for his crimes. 

Hedin's weighted-down body was later found in Lake Brösarp. His corpse was transported to the Institution of Anatomy at Lund University. It was stored at the institution until 1974, when it was cremated.

Victims
Bengta Andersson, 85
Elna Andersson, 82
Hilda Hedin, 57, Hedin's mother
Per Alfred Hedin, 74, Hedin's father
Nils Larsson, 84
Agnes Lundén, 54
Maria Nilsdotter, 69
Ulla Östberg, 23
Marie Petersson, 80
John Allan Nilsson, 32

References

External links

 Pictures of the crime scene and some of Hedin's victims
In 1986 an episode of the mini-series "Skånska Mord", titled "Hurvamorden", was made about these tragic events. Ernst-Hugo Järegård played the role of Tore Hedin in this episode.
Drabssager I Sverige

1927 births
1952 suicides
20th century in Skåne County
Swedish mass murderers
Swedish spree killers
Swedish police officers
Murder–suicides in Sweden
Suicides by drowning in Sweden
Arsonists
Axe murder
Mass stabbings
Stabbing attacks in Sweden
Parricides